Olivetti P6066 was a personal computer programmable with a version of  Basic owned by Olivetti and integrated in the operating system.

Description 
It was identical to Olivetti P6060 in the mechanical design; however, the color (white) and performances were different.

It was an improved version of the P6060, from which it was possible to make an upgrade.

Head of the development was Pier Giorgio Perotto, and the production site was Scarmagno.

External links 
Retro Computer museum, Zatec, Czech Republic video
Archivio Olivetti

Olivetti personal computers
Computer-related introductions in 1975